Borough of Southwark could refer to:

London Borough of Southwark (1965—present)
Metropolitan Borough of Southwark (1900–1965)
Ancient borough of Southwark